José Miguel González Rey (born 15 November 1979), known as Josemi, is a Spanish former footballer. Mainly a right back, he also played as a central defender.

He appeared in 178 La Liga matches over nine seasons (one goal), with Málaga, Villarreal and Mallorca, also representing Liverpool for one and a half seasons where he won two major titles including the 2005 Champions League. He later competed professionally in Greece, before moving to the newly formed Indian Super League.

Club career

Early career
Born in Torremolinos, Málaga, Josemi started his professional career at Málaga CF, arriving from local amateurs Torremolinos Club de Fútbol in 1998. He started appearing for his new club with the reserve team, in Tercera División.

After one match in 2000–01's closer, a 0–4 away loss against Deportivo de La Coruña on 17 June 2001, Josemi went on to become an essential defensive element for the Andalusia side, helping them to the 2002 UEFA Intertoto Cup and soon attracting interest from bigger European clubs.

Liverpool
Subsequently, Josemi became Rafael Benítez's first signing as Liverpool manager, for £2 million in the summer of 2004. He played 15 games in the Premier League in his debut season and, after an initial run, he was sent off in the club's 4–2 victory at Fulham on 16 October 2004, his subsequent ban leading to Steve Finnan re-establishing himself as first-choice right-back.

Josemi made seven appearances (five starts) in the Reds' victorious campaign in the UEFA Champions League, but struggled to make the substitutes bench in the knockout stages, and also lost his place in the first half of 2005–06, suggesting he would soon leave Anfield.

Return to Spain
On 29 December 2005, it was announced that Liverpool and Villarreal CF had agreed to swap Josemi and Jan Kromkamp in the January 2006 transfer window. He made a good start and appeared in 22 league matches in 2006–07, but only took part in only one the following season for the eventual La Liga runners-up.

In July 2008, Josemi signed for RCD Mallorca. He scored his first goal as a professional on 23 November, in a 2–2 home draw against former owners Málaga. In his second year he was challenged by new signing Felipe Mattioni, but ended up contributing with 28 games as the Balearic Islands side finished fifth and qualified for the UEFA Europa League.

Later years
At nearly 31, Josemi left Spain for the second time in August 2010, signing a three-year contract with Iraklis Thessaloniki FC. After only one season – which brought Superleague Greece relegation due to irregularities – however, he returned to his country and joined FC Cartagena in Segunda División, on a two-year deal.

On 21 August 2014, after two seasons in Greece with Levadiakos F.C. and Skoda Xanthi F.C. respectively, Josemi was a third-round draft pick for Atlético de Kolkata in the inaugural draft of the Indian Super League draft. He made his debut in the competition in the opening match, starting a 3–0 home victory over Mumbai City FC, and formed a formidable stopper partnership with Arnab Mondal during his first year, acting as team captain in the final win over the Kerala Blasters in the absence of countryman Luis García, where he also won the Fittest Player of the Match award.

Following his successful debut season, on 12 June 2015 Josemi renewed his contract with Atlético for one more year. He was released on 13 November, after being ruled out for the remainder of the campaign due to injury.

On 22 September 2016, after almost a year with a club, 36-year-old Josemi announced his retirement. In February 2017, he returned to Málaga as match delegate.

Club statistics

Honours
Málaga
UEFA Intertoto Cup: 2002

Liverpool
UEFA Champions League: 2004–05
UEFA Super Cup: 2005
Football League Cup: Runner-up 2004–05
FIFA Club World Championship runner-up: 2005

Atlético Kolkata
Indian Super League: 2014

References

External links

Liverpool historic profile

1979 births
Living people
People from Torremolinos
Sportspeople from the Province of Málaga
Spanish footballers
Footballers from Andalusia
Association football defenders
La Liga players
Segunda División players
Tercera División players
Atlético Malagueño players
Málaga CF players
Villarreal CF players
RCD Mallorca players
FC Cartagena footballers
Premier League players
Liverpool F.C. players
Super League Greece players
Iraklis Thessaloniki F.C. players
Levadiakos F.C. players
Xanthi F.C. players
Indian Super League players
ATK (football club) players
UEFA Champions League winning players
Spanish expatriate footballers
Expatriate footballers in England
Expatriate footballers in Greece
Expatriate footballers in India
Spanish expatriate sportspeople in England
Spanish expatriate sportspeople in Greece
Spanish expatriate sportspeople in India